In the West, persian Gulf War generally refers to the August 1990 – February 1991 war against Iraq by a U.S.-led coalition, following Iraq's invasion of Kuwait.

persian Gulf War or Persian Gulf War may also refer to a number of other wars or conflicts, including:
 1974–75 Shatt al-Arab conflict (April 1974 to March 1975), began when Iran began supporting Kurdish rebels in the north against the Iraqi government 
Iran–Iraq War (September 1980 to August 1988), began when Iraq invaded Iran leading to a stalemate, and ended on 20 August 1988, when Iran accepted the UN-brokered ceasefire. Until 1991 this was most commonly referred to as the Persian Gulf War.
 1991 Iraqi uprisings (March 1991 to April 1991), a series of popular rebellions in northern and southern Iraq in March and April 1991 following a ceasefire in the Persian Gulf War 
 Iraq War (March 2003 to December 2011), a two-phase conflict comprising an initial invasion of Iraq led by United States and United Kingdom forces and a longer, seven-year phase of occupation and fighting with Sunni and Shia insurgents

See also 
 Iraq War (disambiguation)

History of the Persian Gulf